Donald L. Frankenfeld (born February 13, 1948) is an American former politician. He served in the South Dakota Senate from 1977 to 1984.

References

1948 births
Living people
Republican Party South Dakota state senators
Yale College alumni
Harvard Business School alumni
Harvard Kennedy School alumni